Sir George Lockwood Morris, 8th Baronet (29 January 1859 - 23 November 1947) was a Welsh industrialist and iron founder. He was also an international rugby union forward who won five caps for Wales. He played club rugby for Swansea, captaining the club through two seasons, and was the first Swansea player to represent Wales.

Biography
George Lockwood Morris was born on 29 January 1859. He was the great-grandson in a junior branch of the family of Sir John Morris, 1st Baronet, the industrialist and founder of the suburb of Morriston in Swansea. He was educated at Clifton College.

Between 1878 and 1884 he was a noted rugby player.

In 1889 he married Wilhelmina Cory of the Cory family at Swansea. They lived at Sketty, and had three children - Muriel, who died in her teens, Cedric Lockwood (1889-1982), who became a noted painter and plantsman, and Nancy (born 1893).

In 1947, at the age of 88, Morris inherited the Morris baronetcy from a distant cousin, three months before his death. On his own death, it passed to his son, the artist Cedric Morris.

Rugby career

Morris joined the Swansea team in 1878, at the age of 19, and in the 1881/82 season he was awarded the captaincy of the Senior XV team, an honour he would hold for the next season.

On 28 January 1882 Morris was selected for the Wales team in their first rugby match against Ireland. Under the captaincy of Charles Lewis, Wales won the game two goals and two tries to nil. Morris was selected for the next four Welsh matches including the very first rugby international played in Wales, at St. Helen's ground, Swansea, in 1883. His final game was in the 1884 Home Nations Championship, in a game played against Scotland at Rodney Parade in Newport. Wales lost the game by a drop goal and a try to nil. Morris and his Swansea teammate Fred Andrews were both replaced from the pack, with Morris' place going to Cardiff's John Hinton.

International matches played
Wales
  1882, 1884
  1882
  1883, 1884

Arms

Notes

References 
 
Kidd, Charles, Williamson, David (editors). Debrett's Peerage and Baronetage (1990 edition). New York: St Martin's Press, 1990, 

Rugby union players from Swansea
Welsh rugby union players
Wales international rugby union players
Rugby union forwards
British industrialists
1859 births
1947 deaths
Baronets in the Baronetage of the United Kingdom
Welsh industrialists
People educated at Clifton College
Swansea RFC players